The National Soccer League Cup, commonly known as the NSL Cup, was a knockout competition in Australian soccer, organised by the Australian Soccer Association (now Football Australia). The record for the most wins was held by Adelaide City with 3 victories. The cup had been won by the same team in two consecutive years only by Brisbane City in the first two editions of the cup.

History
The winners of the first tournament was Brisbane City, who then won it again the next year and to be the only team in competition history to win consecutive NSL Cups.

Results

 The "Season" column refers to the season the competition was held, and wikilinks to the article about that season.
 The wikilinks in the "Score" column point to the article about that season's final game.

Results by team

See also
 List of association football competitions

Notes

References

External links
 National Soccer League – OzFootball Archive
 Australia – List of Regional Cup Winners

NSL Cup
NSL Cup Finals
Lists of association football matches